Future Games was a video game company based in Beroun, Czech Republic. The company focused mostly on adventure games. The studio was closed in 2011 due to financial problems after release of Alter Ego.

Released titles

References 

Defunct video game companies of the Czech Republic
Video game companies established in 1996
Video game companies disestablished in 2011